J. Conrad "Connie" Rasinski (January 28, 1907 in Torrington, Connecticut – October 13, 1965 in Larchmont, New York) was an animation director who did the 1952 animated short "Hansel and Gretel" among others. Rasinski's "House of Hashimoto" was in competition at the 1961 Cannes Film Festival.

Biography
Connie Rasinski was born Constantine Rasinski on January 28, 1907 in Torrington, Connecticut.

As a young man Rasinski studied with Norman Rockwell at the Art Students League of New York. After a variety of jobs, Rasinski decided to become an animator. In 1930 he became an inker for Terrytoons. In 1937 he became a director at Terrytoons.

His filmography includes Mighty Mouse, Heckle and Jeckle, Gandy Goose, Deputy Dawg, Clint Clobber, Terry Bears, and Little Roquefort.

Rasinski died in Larchmont, New York on October 13, 1965.

References

External links 

1907 births
1965 deaths
Terrytoons people
American film directors
Animators from Connecticut
American animated film directors